In journalism, a staff writer byline indicates that the author of the article is an employee of the periodical, as opposed to being an independent freelance writer. In Britain, staff writers may work in the office instead of traveling to cover a beat.

In an advertising agency, copywriting is the main responsibility of staff writers.

In television, a staff writer is the probationary, entry-level position in the "writers room"; that is, the team that creates a television series.

References

See also 

 The Writers' Room TV series

Journalism occupations
Newspaper terminology
Writing occupations